Dutchess may refer to:

Dutchess County, New York, USA
Dutchess Community College
Dutchess County Airport
Dutchess Stadium
Dutchess Turnpike, an early route approximating to U.S. Route 44 in New York
Dutchess Mall
The Dutchess, the debut studio album by American recording artist Fergie

See also

Similar spelling
Duchess, a woman with status equivalent to a duke
Duchess (disambiguation)